Ngoulmakong is a village in East Cameroon, Haut-Nyong Division, Messamena Sub-Division.

Name
In the dominant local language, Bikélé, the name of the village is Nkoulmokouang. The official form Ngoulmakong was given under colonial rule due to influence from Bulu.

The colloquial name Sambe, which is more usually used locally than Ngoulmakong, derives from the name of a type of tree (Sterculia subviolacea) found in the region of the Nyong River, whose hard wood was reputedly used for weapon-making. It is thought that the name originally belonged to a settlement nearer the river, but the settlement was moved to the present site of Ngoulmakong and the name was transferred with it.

Population 
In 1966–1967, the village Ngoulmakong had 383 inhabitants, of the Bikélé ethnic group.

According to the 2005 census, the village had 446 inhabitants.

Characteristics
In 1966–67, the village had a regular market, a dispensary, and a state school covering the full school cycle. As of 2020, the village has a primary school, secondary school (CES), and a medical centre (CSI).

Ngoulmakong is the seat of the chief of the Bikélé North ethnic group.

The economy is dominated by subsistence farming of food crops and cash-cropping of cocoa and coffee.

Gallery

Further reading
 Dictionnaire des villages du Haut-Nyong, Centre ORSTOM de Yaoundé, June 1968, 84 p.
 Étude socio économique forêt communale Messaména/Mindourou, Réalisation ONG PAPEL/CTFC, November 2009, 130 p. 
 Plan communal de développement de Messamena (PCD), PNDP, July 2012, 142 p.

References

Populated places in East Region (Cameroon)